Magic Camera, sometimes known as Magic Camera virtual webcam, is an application for Microsoft Windows to generate virtual webcams on windows, which can be used to stream files/screens as webcam, or create webcam effects on physical webcam.
Since the first release of Magic Camera on 20 March 2006, its author ShiningMorning Soft has maintained and kept the product shareware.

Many Instant Messengers can only read webcams in video chats, however, Magic Camera removes this limitation, it supports many hardware, such as (HD)Webcams, Digital Cameras, TV/Video Capture Cards, DVs, Camcorders, IP Cams(directshow), add video effects on the video, and then stream the videos to Instant Messengers.

Features

Magic Camera feature lists.

Webcam Effects, such as Photo frames, Visual filters, video transforming effects, overlay Flash animations.
Enable webcam Picture in Picture function.
Face tracking with camera.
Change webcam backgrounds.
Paint, type on webcam video.
Turn files/screens as virtual webcams to stream them.
Record webcam.
Split webcam to use it in multiple software.
Create pictures with effects.
Multiple virtual webcams.
Stealth mode virtual webcams to avoid being blocked by some chat software (e.g. chatroulette).
Multiple language support.
Built in virtual sound card.

History
Magic Camera 7.2.1 [5-23-2011]
Magic Camera 7.1.0 [10-28-2010]
Magic Camera 6.8.0 [05-24-2010]
Magic Camera Version 6.0.0 [06-20-2009]
Magic Camera Version 5.8.0 [04-15-2009]
Magic Camera Version 4.8.0 [02-01-2009]
Magic Camera Version 3.0.0 [04-06-2008]
Magic Camera Version 2.0.6 [10-04-2007]
Magic Camera Version 2.0 [08-18-2007]
Magic Camera Version 1.0 [03-20-2006]

From May 2009, MagicCamera supports 64bit Windows 7 with its Kernel mode webcam device driver.

In 2009, Magazine Chip wrote article to introduce Magic Camera webcam effects.

In December 2010, news.NewHua.com, one of the largest online IT websites in China, wrote reviews on MagicCamera to recommend it to China QQ users.

In 2011, data from CNet reported that Magic Camera has about 20k+ downloads/week and 1.4 million downloads in total. It is listed in top 10 popular software on CNet communication category many times.

See also
Comparison of webcam software
Softcam
QQ

References

External links
Magic Camera webcam effects used in YouTube
Magic Camera Homepage
MagicCamera on QQ's site
MagicCamera on Cnet
MagicCamera on Sina.com

Windows-only shareware
Webcams